The Hillery Street Bridge is a vehicular bridge over the Passaic River in Totowa and Woodland Park, New Jersey. The Pratt pony truss carries Hillery Street and Totowa Road and is designated County Route 644. It was originally built in 1898 and rehabilitated in 1973. It was extensively refurbished in 2009 to its original historic state, including its original lattice-work sidewalk railings. A historic bridge survey conducted by the New Jersey Department of Transportation from 1991–1994 determined that the bridge was eligible for listing on the New Jersey Register of Historic Places and the National Register of Historic Places.

See also
List of crossings of the Upper Passaic River
List of crossings of the Lower Passaic River
List of county routes in Passaic County, New Jersey

References 

Bridges over the Passaic River
Bridges completed in 1898
Road bridges in New Jersey
Totowa, New Jersey
Woodland Park, New Jersey
Bridges in Passaic County, New Jersey
Truss bridges in the United States
Steel bridges in the United States